Potisje is the name of the Tisa river basin parts located in Serbia, in the autonomous province of Vojvodina. The river Tisa flow between Banat and Bačka regions.

Municipalities in Potisje

Municipalities in Bačka:
Kanjiža
Senta
Ada
Bečej
Žabalj
Titel

Municipalities in Banat:
Novi Kneževac
Čoka
Kikinda
Novi Bečej
Zrenjanin

History

In the 1st century, ancient author Plinius used name Pathissus to describe a surroundings of the river Tisa. Because of the similarity of this name with modern Slavic name Potisje (meaning approximately "a land around river Tisa" in Slavic), which is a typical Slavic name used for surroundings of the rivers (like Podunavlje, Pomoravlje, etc.), name mentioned by Plinius might indicate an early Slavic presence in the area.

Between 1702 and 1751, the western part of Potisje (in the region of Bačka) belonged to the Tisa-Mureș (Potisje-Pomorišje) section of the Habsburg Military Frontier. Potisje segment of the Frontier included towns near river Tisa: Bečej, Ada, Senta and Kanjiža (in present-day Serbia), Szeged (in present-day Hungary), as well as other places in Bačka, including Subotica, Sombor and Sentomaš (Srbobran). After the abolishment of this part of the Frontier in 1751, many Serbs that lived in the region emigrated to Russia (notably to New Serbia and Slavo-Serbia). To prevent this emigration, the Habsburg authorities formed autonomous District of Potisje with seat in Bečej. District of Potisje existed between 1751 and 1848. The three privileges were given to the district in 1759, 1774, and 1800. First privilege of the District defined its autonomous status, while the second one allowed to ethnic Hungarians to settle in the district. In the following period many Hungarians settled in Potisje and they replaced Serbs as a dominant nation in parts of the region.

Ethnic groups

The municipalities with Serb ethnic majority are: Žabalj (86%), Titel (85%), Novi Kneževac (59%), Kikinda (76%), Novi Bečej (69%), and Zrenjanin (74%).

The municipalities with Hungarian ethnic majority are: Kanjiža (86%), Senta (81%), Ada (77%), and Čoka (52%).

The Bečej municipality is ethnically mixed with 49% Hungarians and 41% Serbs.

Gallery

References

Potiska i Pomoriška vojna granica (1702–1751), Muzej Vojvodine, Novi Sad, 2003.
Dr. Dušan J. Popović, Srbi u Vojvodini, knjige 1-3, Novi Sad, 1990.

Notes

See also
Bačka
Banat
Vojvodina
Geographical regions in Serbia
District of Potisje
Pomorišje

Geographical regions of Serbia
Geography of Vojvodina
Bačka
Banat